
The following lists events that happened during 1800 in South Africa.

Events
 The Government Gazette started printing in the Cape Colony.

References

See Years in South Africa for list of References

History of South Africa